Juniata Gap is an unincorporated community and census-designated place (CDP) in Blair County, Pennsylvania, United States. It was first listed as a CDP prior to the 2020 census.

The CDP is in western Blair County, in the northwestern part of Logan Township. It sits on the north side of Spring Run at the base of the Allegheny Front, which rises to an elevation of  one mile to the west.

Juniata Gap Road is the main route through the community, leading northwest up Spring Run onto the Allegheny Plateau at Wopsononock and southeast into the northern part of Altoona.

Demographics

References 

Census-designated places in Blair County, Pennsylvania
Census-designated places in Pennsylvania